
Gmina Środa Śląska is an urban-rural gmina (administrative district) in Środa Śląska County, Lower Silesian Voivodeship, in south-western Poland. It is part of the Wrocław metropolitan area.

Neighbouring gminas
Gmina Środa Śląska is bordered by the gminas of Brzeg Dolny, Kostomłoty, Malczyce, Miękinia, Udanin, Wądroże Wielkie and Wołów.

Villages
Apart from the town of Środa Śląska, the gmina contains the villages of Brodno, Bukówek, Cesarzowice, Chwalimierz, Ciechów, Gozdawa, Jastrzębce, Jugowiec, Juszczyn, Kobylniki, Komorniki, Kryniczno, Kulin, Lipnica, Michałów, Ogrodnica, Pęczków, Proszków, Przedmoście, Rakoszyce, Rzeczyca, Słup, Święte, Szczepanów, Wojczyce, Wrocisławice and Zakrzów.

Twin towns – sister cities

Gmina Środa Śląska is twinned with:
 Kamianka-Buzka, Ukraine
 Saterland, Germany
 Štěpánov, Czech Republic

References

Sroda Slaska
Środa Śląska County